Elections to Tameside Council were held on 5 May 2011. One third of the council was up for election, with each successful candidate to serve a four-year term of office, expiring in 2015. The Labour Party retained overall control of the council.

Results

Ashton Hurst ward

Ashton St. Michael's ward

Ashton Waterloo ward

Audenshaw ward

Denton North East ward

Denton South ward

Denton West ward

Droylsden East ward

Droylsden West ward

Dukinfield ward

Dukinfield / Stalybridge ward

Hyde Godley ward

Hyde Newton ward

Hyde Werneth ward

Longdendale ward

Mossley ward

St. Peters ward

Stalybridge North ward

Stalybridge South ward

References

2011 English local elections
2011
2010s in Greater Manchester